Doruk Çetin (born 15 May 1987) is a Turkish film director, film producer, photographer and actor.

Career
Çetin is the nephew of film director Sinan Cetin and Muhsin Ertugrul who had important contributions to both Turkish theatre and Turkish cinema. He had established Vodvil Management and Miasma Film located in Istanbul & Los Angeles. He shows activities in Hollywood with participation of make-up artist Jason Lotfi who had worked with such artists like Madonna and Ben Stiller.

Doruk Çetin starred in a feature film titled Yankee Go Home starring Leelee Sobieski, Jeroen Krabbé, Mehmet Aslan and Omur Arpaci, directed by his uncle Sinan Cetin.

He produced and directed the TV show Garaj in Fox Turkey channel. The show focuses on getting a messy car in Garaj workshop, renovating it and giving it away to a lucky audience chosen through SMS. He also produced and directed Extreme-G in CNN Turk channel starring famous Turkish rockstar Hayko Cepkin.

External links

Doruk Çetin Official Site
Miasma Film Official Site
 

1987 births
Turkish film directors
Turkish film producers
Turkish photographers
Living people